Crime Wave, also known as The Big Crime Wave, is a 1985 Canadian independent surrealist comedy film written, produced and directed by Winnipeg-based filmmaker John Paizs. It was shot between 1984 and 1986. The film lacked a major release in Canada and abroad, and remained almost as a "curiosity" that a few fans and movie critics remembered fondly. Over time, word-of-mouth and some retrospective showings at film festivals helped Crime Wave to achieve a bigger notoriety, and it is currently considered as a cult film.

Plot 
The film is a homage to late 1940s-early 1950s "colour crime pictures".  Paizs plays Steven Penny, a struggling screenwriter who lives above the garage of a suburban family, and begins typing each night from the moment the street lamp comes on.  Everything we learn about the character comes from Kim (Eva Kovacs), the family's daughter, who has a schoolgirl crush on him, as Penny never utters a word in the entire film.

Steven is able to write beginnings and endings, but not middles, and the movie depicts these endings and beginnings that introduce several characters from various geographic regions to settle upon the film's hero "from the North".

Style 
The film is designed to emulate the look and feel of educational films from the period.  Randolph Peters includes a flute and glockenspiel-based score emulating such films (the film concludes with a song based on this theme that discusses the possibility of Steven and Kim getting married sung by a small 1950s-style pop chorus).  When Steven Penny is brought into some shady deals, the film takes on more of a neo noir look and sound, inflected with surrealism. One of the film's signature images is the one of a street lamp smashed over Steven's head, which he wears home.

References

External links
 
 Cineflyer

Canadian comedy films
1985 films
English-language Canadian films
Films about filmmaking
1985 comedy films
Films set in Winnipeg
Films shot in Winnipeg
1980s English-language films
1980s Canadian films